Edward F. Merrill (April 11, 1883 – January 31, 1962) was a justice of the Maine Supreme Judicial Court from June 2, 1948, to April 7, 1954, serving as chief justice from March 18, 1953, to April 7, 1954.

Born in Skowhegan, Maine, Merrill was educated at the local schools. He received a B.A. from Bowdoin College in 1903 and a J.D. from Harvard Law School in 1906. From 1933 until 1935, Merrill was President of the Maine State Bar Association.

On February 1, 1945, Governor Horace Hildreth appointed Merrill was to a seat on the Maine Superior Court. On June 2, 1948, Governor Hildreth appointed Merrill to a seat on the Maine Supreme Judicial Court vacated by Edward P. Murray. On March 18, 1953, Governor Burton M. Cross elevated Merrill to chief justice. Merrill retired from the Court on April 7, 1954, and thereafter "served as a legislative consultant for many years for Central Maine Power Company".

Merrill died in his home, in Skowhegan.

References

Justices of the Maine Supreme Judicial Court
1883 births
1962 deaths
People from Skowhegan, Maine
Bowdoin College alumni
Harvard Law School alumni
20th-century American judges